Geoffrey Gower-Jones(30 April 1910 – 5 November 1982) was Archdeacon of Lancaster from 1966 to 1980.

He was born into an ecclesiastical family educated at Brasenose College, Oxford and ordained in  1934. After curacies in Royton and Prestwich he became Vicar of Belfield in 1943; and then of  St Stephen-on-the-Cliffs, Blackpool before his archdeacon’s appointment.

References

1910 births
1982 deaths
Alumni of Brasenose College, Oxford
Archdeacons of Lancaster